Blue Star Press is an American book publishing company headquartered in Bend, Oregon. The company, which began as Blue Star Coloring, was founded by Camden Hendricks and Peter Licalzi. They have published over 200 books since their formation in March 2015, including several New York Times bestsellers. In 2019, the company announced a partnership with Penguin Random House Publisher Services. The multi-year deal allows Penguin Random House Publisher Services to sell and distribute all of Blue Star Press' frontlist and backlist book titles. In 2020, 2021, and 2022, the company was named one of the industry's fastest-growing publishers by Publishers Weekly. Blue Star Press has been featured in USA Today and worked with authors including NBC News Special Anchor Maria Shriver and Olympian Kara Goucher. The company also publishes the bestselling game Millennial Lotería, a modern take on the Mexican bingo game. The company currently works with around 45 independent artists.

See also 
 Coloring book

References

External links 
 

Companies based in Bend, Oregon
Book publishing companies based in Oregon
Drawing
Painting
Publishing companies established in 2015
American companies established in 2015
2015 establishments in Oregon